The following are the scheduled events of women's association football for 2018 throughout the world.

Events

January
 January 1 – Olympique Lyonnais is joined by Morgan Brian, whose venture would turn out to be short-lived, and Amandine Henry. 
 January 5 – Stanford's Andi Sullivan is awarded the 2017 Hermann Trophy.
 January 7 – Pernille Harder becomes the first footballer in either category to win the Danish Player of the Year four years in a row.
 January 8 – John Herdman leaves the Canadian WNT for its male counterpart and is replaced by the team's assistant coach, Kenneth Heiner-Møller.
 January 11 – Portland Thorns FC trades Allie Long to Seattle Reign in exchange for Caitlin Foord and a second round pick in the 2020 Draft.
 January 14 – Arsenal and Manchester City, the only teams to win the Continental Cup after seven years, qualify for the competition's final.
 January 18 — NWSL stars Sam Kerr, Carli Lloyd and Christen Press are transferred to Chicago Red Stars, Sky Blue and Houston Dash respectively within a complex trade. Andi Sullivan is chosen by Washington Spirit in the 2018 NWSL Draft No. 1 pick, with Savannah McCaskill and Rebecca Quinn following in the top three.
 January 20 – The Netherlands suffers its first defeat since winning the UEFA Euro in an away friendly against Spain.
 January 23 – Phil Neville is appointed as England's head coach and immediately faces a controversy over a number of sexist tweets he wrote in 2012, prompting him to apologize.
 January 28 — Boston Breakers are disestablished following a last minute ownership deal collapse and leave the 2018 NWSL season with nine teams. Mexico wins its first CONCACAF U-20 Championship on penalties over the United States, and Haiti qualifies for the U-20 World Cup for the first time, leaving Canada out.
 January 29 – Brazil and Paraguay take the two last spots for the U-20 World Cup, while Venezuela, including 2017 The Best finalist Deyna Castellanos, fails to qualify.
 January 30 – Rose Lavelle is chosen by Washington Spirit as the first pick in the NWSL Dispersal Draft held  due to Boston Breakers's folding.
 January 31 – Brazil extends its complete domination of the U-20 Sudamericano to an 8th title after overwhelming Paraguay in the final game.

February
 February 1 – Sarah Hagen announces her retirement and joins Orlando City Youth's coaching staff.
 February 2 – Sydney Leroux is traded by Utah Royals in exchange for Orlando Pride's 2019 Draft first round pick.
 February 4 – Canberra United wins the W-League's regular stage five years later with a three-point advantage over Sydney. 
 February 8 – FIFA unveils the 2019 World Cup calendar, with France scheduled to play the inaugural match in Paris' Parc des Princes on June 7 and the final being held in Lyon's Parc Olympique Lyonnais on July 7.
 February 10 – Hope Solo ranks second-to-last in the US Soccer presidential election with just 1.4% of the votes; "I am not surprised. From day one we knew it would be very difficult to overthrow the establishment" she comments.
 February 11 – W-League's regular season winner Brisbane Roar is knocked out in the Finals Series by the competition's defending champion, Melbourne City.
 February 14 – Ellie Carpenter, Emily van Egmond and Elise Thorsnes join Portland Thorns FC, Orlando Pride and Utah Royals respectively following the end of their teams' run in the W-League.
 February 18 – Melbourne City defeats Sydney in the W-League's grand final and leaps to the top of the championship's palmares with an unprecedented third title in a row.
 February 19 – Casey Stoney retires at 35 and joins Phil Neville's staff in the England national team.
 February 21 – Manchester City suffers its first defeat in the FA WSL against Birmingham City and loses the lead of the table to Chelsea.
 February 24 – Bayern Munich loses the Bundesliga's second place to Freiburg just as the latter's Laura Benkarth and Lina Magull are announced to join it after the end of the season.
 February 25 – Crystal Dunn leaves Chelsea to join North Carolina Courage back in the NWSL.
 February 26 – The FA renames 2nd-tier Super League 2 and 3rd/4th-tier Premier League as Championship and National League respectively.

March
 March 7 — The Algarve Cup trophy is shared for the first time as the final has to be cancelled due to weather issues, with the Netherlands and Sweden winning it ex aequo. Spain becomes the first national team to win both the Algarve Cup and the Cyprus Cup in its debut appearances.
 March 8 — FIFPro concedes its 2017 Women's World XI Award to Lindahl, Bronze, Renard, Fischer, Paredes, Marta, Marozsán, Abily, Morgan, Harder and Martens, with Martens, Bronze and Renard receiving the most votes.
 March 9 — Houston Dash is told Christen Press won't join the team two weeks before the start of the 2018 NWSL season, leaving it with no trade after handing Carli Lloyd to Sky Blue.
 March 11 — Kopparbergs/Göteborg players show their disagreement as the team is knocked out of the Svenska Cupen's quarterfinals as per the previous season's ranking following a 1–1 draw against Linköpings, with no overtime nor penalty shootout.
 March 13 — Steffi Jones is sacked by Germany one week after the team ended last the 2018 SheBelieves Cup and Horst Hrubesch takes over as interim coach, becoming the first man to coach the team since Gero Bisanz in the 1996 Olympics.
 March 16 — Gianni Infantino's proposal for a 16-WNT world league with confederation-wide second tiers fails to be approved in the Bogotá FIFA Council meeting.
 March 17 — 22,202 attend Atlético Madrid's first appearance in the new Metropolitano Stadium, where the team draws against Madrid but remains in the lead after Barcelona also fails to defeat Sporting Huelva the following day.
 March 21 — Manchester United announces its intention to launch a women's team and applies for a Championship spot. Ana-Maria Crnogorčević signs for Portland Thorns FC after nearly a decade in the Frauen-Bundesliga. Elise Kellond-Knight is unable to join Seattle Reign as NC Courage exerts a discovery claim, unknown to her.
 March 23 — England reaches an unprecedented second position in the FIFA Ranking surpassing Germany, and France returns to the top 5 as Australia loses two positions.
 March 26 — Christen Press returns to Kopparbergs/Göteborg six years later, with Houston Dash, "disappointed" but "comfortable with the outcome", retaining her NWSL rights.
 March 28 — For the first time two English teams reach the Champions League's semifinals as Chelsea and Manchester City defeat Montpellier and Linköpings in both legs, qualifying along with defending champion Lyon and Wolfsburg, which make it past Barcelona and Slavia Prague.

April
 April 6 — The 2019 World Cup UEFA qualifiers' Netherlands–Northern Ireland and England–Wales gather the new two top attendances in European qualifiers yet, with crowds of 30,238 and 25,603 respectively; Belgium and the Republic of Ireland also enjoy national record attendances.
 April 8 — Carli Lloyd scores at 35 her 100th goal for the United States in a 6–2 win over Mexico.
 April 13 — Australia, China, Japan and Thailand qualify for the 2018 Asian Cup's semifinals and thus for the 2019 World Cup.
 April 16 — South Korea beats 5–0 the Philippines in the Asian Cup's 5th place play-off to clinch the last AFC ticket for the World Cup.
 April 17 — Australia and defending champion Japan qualify for the Asian Cup final, with Alanna Kennedy avoiding a historic victory for Thailand with an extra-time tier.
 April 18 — Japan wins its second Asian Cup with the same scoreline and opponent as in 2014, a 1–0 win over Australia.
 April 19 — Adidas is criticized for using a model instead of an Argentina player in the unveiling of the team's new kits.
 April 22 — Manchester City puts an end to Lyon's all-wins record through the season with a 0–0 draw in the Champions League semifinals' 1st leg while Wolfsburg approaches the final with an away win over Chelsea.
 April 26 — Switzerland's Martina Voss-Tecklenburg is signed as Germany's new coach following the end of the 2019 World Cup's UEFA qualifiers in November.
 April 29 — Lyon wins Manchester City 1–0 to defend the Champions League title against Wolfsburg in a repeat of the 2013 and 2016 finals.

International WNT competitions
 Inaugural editions are marked in blue. Successful defending champions are marked in yellow.

Official

Invitational

note 1 The final match was cancelled due to weather issues and both teams were awarded the title.

International club competitions

Official

Invitational

National competitions

UEFA

AFC

References

 
Women's association football by year